India's busiest airports is the list of top fifty busiest airports of over a hundred commercially operational airports in the country. Data also includes statistics for total aircraft movements and total cargo movements. The tables below contain annual data published by the Airports Authority of India on the busiest airports in India by total passenger traffic, aircraft movements and cargo handled.

The lists are presented in chronological order starting from the latest ended fiscal year. The number of total passengers for an airport is measured in persons and includes any passenger that arrives at, departs from or is on a transit from that airport. The number of total aircraft movements is measured in airplane-times and includes all the takeoffs and landings of all kinds of aircraft in scheduled or charter conditions. The total cargo handled is expressed in metric tonnes and includes all the freight and mail that arrives at or departs from the airport.

In graph 
Graph is computed into civil years according to monthly data in sources.

April 2021 – March 2022
List of Top 50 busiest airports of India by passenger traffic for fiscal year 2021–22, i.e. for the period 1 April 2021 - 31 March 2022.

Passenger Traffic 

Source: Airports Authority of India

April 2020 – March 2021
List of Top 50 busiest airports of India by passenger traffic for fiscal year 2020–21, i.e. for the period 1 April 2020 - 31 March 2021.

Passenger Traffic 

Source: Airports Authority of India

Aircraft movement

Source: Airports Authority of India

April 2019 - March 2020
List of top 50 busiest airports of India by passenger traffic, aircraft movement and cargo handled for fiscal year 2019–20, i.e. 1 April 2019- 31 March 2020
.

Passenger traffic 

Source : Airports Authority of India

Aircraft movement

Source: Airports Authority of India

April 2018 – March 2019
List of top 50 busiest airports of India by passenger traffic, aircraft movement and cargo handled for fiscal year 2018–19, i.e. 1 April 2018 - 31 March 2019.

Passenger traffic 

Source: Airports Authority of India

Aircraft movement

Source: Airports Authority of India

April 2017 – March 2018
List of top 50 busiest airports of India by passenger traffic, aircraft movement and cargo handled for fiscal year 2017–18, i.e. April 2017 - March 2018.

Passenger traffic 

Source: Airports Authority of India

Aircraft movement

Source: Airports Authority of India

Cargo

Source: Airports Authority of India

April 2016 – March 2017
List of top 50 busiest airports of India by passenger traffic, aircraft movement and cargo traffic for fiscal year 2016–17, i.e. April 2016 - March 2017.

Passenger traffic 

Source: Airports Authority of India

Aircraft movement

Source: Airports Authority of India

Cargo

Source: Airports Authority of India

April 2015 – March 2016
List of top 50 busiest airports of India by passenger traffic, aircraft movement and cargo traffic for fiscal year 2015–16, i.e. April 2015 - March 2016.

Passenger traffic

Source: Airports Authority of India

Aircraft movement

Source: Airports Authority of India

Cargo

Source: Airports Authority of India

See also
World's busiest airports by passenger traffic
List of airports in India

References

 Busiest
India, Passenger Traffic